In December 1996 the United Nations proclaimed 21 November as World Television Day commemorating the date on which the first World Television Forum was held in 1996.

Opposition to this declaration took the form of 11 abstentions to a vote on the resolution; in expressing their opposition, the delegation from Germany said:

References

Recurring events established in 1996
United Nations days
November observances
History of television